Branch County is a county in the U.S. state of Michigan. As of the 2020 Census, the population was 44,862. The county seat is Coldwater. As one of the "cabinet counties" it was named for the U.S. Secretary of the Navy John Branch under President Andrew Jackson. The county was founded in 1829, and was organized in 1833.

Branch County comprises the Coldwater, MI Micropolitan Statistical Area.

History
Branch County was a New England settlement. The original founders of Coldwater were settlers from the northern coastal colonies – "Yankees", descended from the English Puritans who came from the Old World in the 1600s and who brought their culture. During the early 1800s, there was a wave of New England farmers who headed west into what was then the untamed Northwest Territory. Many traveled through New York State via the Erie Canal; the threat of Native Americans had been reduced by the end of the Black Hawk War.

These early settlers laid out farms, constructed roads, erected government buildings, and established post routes. They brought a passion for education, and established many schools. Many were supporters of abolitionism. They were mostly members of the Congregationalist Church though some were Episcopalian. Culturally Branch County, like much of Michigan, developed as part of the Northern Tier, continuous with New England culture, during its early history. The county still depends on agriculture as the basis of its economy.

Geography
It is the third-smallest county in Michigan by total area. The only island in the county is Iyopawa Island.

Adjacent counties

 Kalamazoo County – northwest
 Calhoun County – north
 Hillsdale County – east
 Steuben County, Indiana – south
 LaGrange County, Indiana – southwest
 St. Joseph County – west

Major highways
  – runs north–south through central Branch County. Runs east of Girard, Coldwater and Kinderhook.
  – runs through Coldwater.
  – runs ENE through central Branch County. Passes Bronson, Coldwater and Quincy.
  – runs through northern part of county. Enters near Union City; runs west 5 miles (8 km) to intersection with M60, south of Athens.
  – runs through NW tip of county. Enters west line from Leonidas, Michigan, runs east 2.4 miles ( 4 km), turns north to exit county toward Athens, Michigan.
  runs east–west through central Branch County. Enters from Colon, Michigan, runs east to intersection with US12, three miles (5 km) west of Coldwater.

Demographics

The 2010 United States Census indicates Branch County had a 2010 population of 45,248. This decrease of -539 people from the 2000 United States Census represents a -1.2% growth decrease during the decade. In 2010 there were 16,419 households and 11,350 families in the county. The population density was 89.4 per square mile (34.5 square kilometers). There were 20,841 housing units at an average density of 41.2 per square mile (15.9 square kilometers). The racial and ethnic makeup of the county was 90.9% White, 3.0% Black or African American, 0.4% Native American, 0.4% Asian, 4.0% Hispanic or Latino, 0.1% from other races, and 1.2% from two or more races.

There were 16,419 households, out of which 31.5% had children under the age of 18 living with them, 52.2% were husband and wife families, 11.1% had a female householder with no husband present, 30.9% were non-families, and 25.8% were made up of individuals. The average household size was 2.56 and the average family size was 3.05.

In the county, the population was spread out, with 23.9% under age of 18, 8.0% from 18 to 24, 25.0% from 25 to 44, 28.3% from 45 to 64, and 14.7% who were 65 years of age or older. The median age was 40 years. For every 100 females there were 111.4 males. For every 100 females age 18 and over, there were 112.9 males.

The 2010 American Community Survey 3-year estimate indicates the median income for a household in the county was $41,855 and the median income for a family was $48,959. Males had a median income of $25,595 versus $17,263 for females. The per capita income for the county was $18,289. About 2.5% of families and 17.7% of the population were below the poverty line, including 25.3% of those under the age 18 and 9.0% of those age 65 or over.

Government
Branch County has been reliably Republican since the parties' founding. Since 1884, the Republican Party nominee has carried 85% of the elections (29 of 34).

The county government operates the jail, maintains rural roads, operates the major local courts, records deeds, mortgages, and vital records, administers public health regulations, and participates with the state in the provision of social services. The county board of commissioners controls the budget and has limited authority to make laws or ordinances. In Michigan, most local government functions — police and fire, building and zoning, tax assessment, street maintenance, etc. — are the responsibility of individual cities and townships.

Elected officials

 Prosecuting Attorney: Zachary Stempien
 Sheriff: John Pollack
 County Clerk: Terry Kubasiak
 County Treasurer: Ann Vrablic
 Register of Deeds: Nancy Hutchins
 Drain Commissioner: Michael Hard
 County Surveyor: Edward W. Reed
 County Commissioners: Terri Norris, Leonard Kolcz, Donald Vrablic, Ted Gordon, Randall Hazelbaker

Information correct as of March 2017.

Communities

Cities
 Bronson
 Coldwater (county seat)

Villages
 Quincy
 Sherwood
 Union City

Unincorporated communities

 Batavia Center
 Canada Shores
 Crystal Beach
 East Gilead
 Hodunk
 Lockwood
 Pearl Beach
 Ray
 Sans Souci Beach
 South Butler
 West Kinderhook

Townships

 Algansee Township
 Batavia Township
 Bethel Township
 Bronson Township
 Butler Township
 California Township
 Coldwater Township
 Gilead Township
 Girard Township
 Kinderhook Township
 Matteson Township
 Noble Township
 Ovid Township
 Quincy Township
 Sherwood Township
 Union Township

See also
 List of Michigan State Historic Sites in Branch County, Michigan
 Mickesawbe
 National Register of Historic Places listings in Branch County, Michigan
 USS Branch County (LST-482)

References

External links
 Branch County government
 Branch County Tourism Bureau
 Branch County Chamber of Commerce
 Office of the County Clerk
 

 
Michigan counties
1833 establishments in Michigan Territory
Populated places established in 1833